NBA Courtside 2002 is a  basketball video game developed by Left Field Productions and published by Nintendo for the GameCube in 2002. It is the third and final installment in the NBA Courtside series and the sequel to NBA Courtside 2: Featuring Kobe Bryant on the  Nintendo 64.

Gameplay 
The game features every player from the 2001-02 NBA season, each with his own unique stats, and has season and arcade modes.

The player can customize their team and players, from their statistical attributes to their names and faces. There is a practice gameplay mode as well as a mode to compete against other teams.

Development 

The game was first released in the United States. The European release followed three weeks later. Left Field, the developer, was not expected to work with Nintendo again after this release.

The game's Brazilian release shipped with a fatal crash bug that partly resulted from the Brazilian GameCubes' use of the PAL-M system.  Consequently, the system software for consoles released in that country was updated to automatically install a software patch for the game to fix the bug whenever it was loaded.

Reception 

Overall, NBA Courtside 2002 received "average" reviews according to the review aggregation website Metacritic. In Japan, Famitsu gave it a score of 32 out of 40. The game did receive criticism; IGN had issues with the game's artificial intelligence and GameSpy said the "Skills Mode" was "nothing to spend too much time on".

NBA Courtside 2002 had sold over 120,000 copies since its release.

Tom Bramwell of Eurogamer described the game as having great depth and completely outclassing its competitor, NBA Live 2002. He wrote that the game highlighted what Electronic Arts was missing from their own basketball games. In addition to matching their statistical accuracy, Bramwell felt that NBA Courtside was a better simulation and offered an "arcade mode" that competed with the scope of the also-praised NBA Street. Bramwell praised the graphics, gameplay, artificial intelligence, and ball physics. He had particular praise for the sound effects' level of detail.

References

External links
 

2002 video games
GameCube-only games
Left Field Productions games
National Basketball Association video games
NBA Courtside
Nintendo games
GameCube games
Video games developed in the United States
Video game sequels
Multiplayer and single-player video games